Aşıqlı, Beylagan or Ashykhly may refer to:
Birinci Aşıqlı, Azerbaijan
İkinci Aşıqlı, Azerbaijan